Ministry of Planning may refer to:

 Ministry of Planning (Bangladesh)
 Ministry of Planning, Budget, and Management, Brazil
 Ministry of Planning (Cambodia)
 Ministry of Planning (India)
 Ministry of Planning (Iraq)